Martin High School can refer to:

Canada
Martin Collegiate, Regina, Saskatchewan

United Kingdom
The Martin High School, Anstey, Leicestershire, England

United States
Martin High School (Martin, Michigan)
James Martin High School (Arlington, Texas)
Martin High School (Laredo, Texas)
 Brother Martin High School, New Orleans, Louisiana
 St. Martin High School, St. Martin, Mississippi
 Martin High School, which later became Altheimer-Sherrill High School, Altheimer, Arkansas
 Martin High School, which later became Westview High School, Martin, Tennessee

See also
 Martin County High School, Stuart, Florida